Sebastian Żydowski (Lidvinski) (died 1560) was a Roman Catholic prelate who served as  Auxiliary Bishop of Gniezno (1541–1560).

Biography
On 27 August 1541, Sebastian Żydowski was appointed during the papacy of Pope Clement VII as Auxiliary Bishop of Gniezno and Titular Bishop of Athyra. It is uncertain how long he served as Auxiliary Bishop of Gniezno.

References 

16th-century Roman Catholic bishops in Poland
Bishops appointed by Pope Clement VII
1560 deaths